OnStream Holdings of the Netherlands was spun off from Philips in 1998 and went bankrupt for a second time in 2003.

As a result of its first bankruptcy in 2001, the company was split into two parts, OnStream Data and OnStream MST.  The "Data" division manufactured magnetic tape products and the "MST" division produced the thin film tape heads.  MST also produced microsieves and microelectromechanical systems products.  After the second OnStream bankruptcy in 2003, the MST division was reborn as fluXXion, a maker of high tech filtering products. fluXXion had some success in filtering beer and other food products, but went bankrupt in 2011.

Prior to the first bankruptcy, the CEO was William B. Beierwaltes, a tape systems pioneer and founder of Colorado Memory Systems.

The company's magnetic tape data storage technology was called Advanced Digital Recording (ADR).  Tape drives based on this technology were relatively high in data capacity and low in price.

References

External links 
 

Electronics companies of the Netherlands